Bucureștii Noi (New Bucharest) is a district situated in the north-west of Bucharest, Romania, in Sector 1.

History
At the end of the 19th century the area was known as Măicănești or Grefoaicele and was owned by Nicolae Bazilescu.  The domain stretched on 295 hectares from which 155 hectares were put out for sale and the rest was donated to the public domain for the construction of streets and parks.

In the past the area was a part of Băneasa commune, then it became a part of the town of Grivița. It was integrated in the Bucharest area in the early 1950s when construction of apartment blocks started on the right side of Bucureștii Noi boulevard, using typical Stalinist architecture. In the mid-1960s, 10-storey apartment buildings were constructed, this time, featuring more modernist styling.

Overview
Bucureștii Noi is a fast-growing district, with many houses and supermarkets being constructed in the last years in the area. The neighborhood center is dominated by a park, Park Bazilescu (also known as Nicholas Bălcescu), opposite the Bazilescu Church.

The neighborhood contains many penthouses and modern villas which serve a small community of families who own private courtyards. These buildings are an alternative way of living very different from the communist-style apartment blocks found in the other districts of the city.

The neighborhood is very popular because it has a good infrastructure, fully paved streets and a well-maintained sewage, water, gas and electricity systems, as well as parks, swimming pools, kindergartens, schools, markets, retail stores and soon also a big shopping mall.

Fauna and flora
The fauna and flora are quite well taken care of. Lake Grivița that borders the neighborhood in the north and east contributes to the fresh air feeling.

Transport
Residents have an easy access both to Otopeni Airport and to the central site of Piața Victoriei. The district is served by the Parc Bazilescu metro station. The Bucureștii Noi train station serves the Căile Ferate Române Line 900, which connects Bucharest with the western city of Timișoara.

References

Districts of Bucharest